Harper's Young People was an American children's magazine between 1879 and 1899. The first issue appeared in the fall of 1879. It was published by Harper & Brothers. It was Harper's fourth magazine to be established, after Harper's Magazine (1850), Harper's Weekly (1857), and Harper's Bazaar (1867). Harper's Young People was the first of the four magazines to cease publication.

Harper's Young People began in November 1879 as a weekly illustrated 16-page magazine that contained fiction and non-fiction works. Its first editor (1879–1881) was Kirk Munroe. It was advertised as being appropriate for boys and girls ages six to 16. It was renamed Harper's Round Table and it changed its target demographic to teenage boys beginning with volume XVI number 809 at the end of April 1895. The magazine ceased publication in 1899.

References

External links
Harper's Young People, Vol. 7, Issues 314-365 (1886)
Harper's Young People, Vol. 9, Issue 5 (1887)
 

Children's magazines published in the United States
Defunct magazines published in the United States
Magazines established in 1879
Magazines disestablished in 1899
Weekly magazines published in the United States